Kristine Bjerknes (born 22 February 1976) is a Norwegian rower. She competed in the women's double sculls event at the 1996 Summer Olympics.

References

External links
 

1976 births
Living people
Norwegian female rowers
Olympic rowers of Norway
Rowers at the 1996 Summer Olympics
Sportspeople from Drammen